The Big Gay Sketch Show is an LGBT-themed sketch comedy program that debuted on Logo on April 24, 2007. The series is produced by Rosie O'Donnell and directed by Amanda Bearse. The program was originally titled The Big Gay Show but was renamed during production. As the name indicates, the show features comedy sketches with gay themes or a gay twist. Sketch topics include parodies of old sitcoms like The Honeymooners and The Facts of Life under the Nick at Nite-parodying heading "Logo at Nite", a lesbian speed dating session, and an extended send-up of Broadway legend Elaine Stritch working as a Wal-Mart greeter, among other decidedly un-glamorous jobs.

Logo produced a second season of the series. Paolo Andino and Colman Domingo joined the cast (replacing Michael Serrato and Dion Flynn). Season 2 premiered on February 5, 2008.

Production on season three began in March 2009, with Erica Ash no longer part of the cast. In 2009, Logo conducted a search for new cast members. However, the result, entitled "The Big Gay Casting Competition", was limited to an online talent search, in which videos by contestants were uploaded to logoonline.com and voted on by site visitors. The winner, Wil Heuser, was a former American Idol contestant and Big Brother cast member (season 14), and only appeared in one episode of the series as an extra. The third, and so far final season was broadcast in 2010.

Cast
 Paolo Andino (Season 2–3)
 Colman Domingo (Season 2–3)
 Julie Goldman (Season 1–3)
 Stephen Guarino (Season 1–3)
 Jonny McGovern (Season 1–3)
 Kate McKinnon (Season 1–3)
 Nicol Paone (Season 1–3)
 Erica Ash (Season 1–2)
 Dion Flynn (Season 1 only)
 Michael Serrato (Season 1 only)

Recurring characters and sketches
Recurring original BGSS characters include: 
 Gay Werewolf (McGovern), a straight man who turns gay - and hairy - under the light of a full moon.
 Svetlana (Guarino), an ex-KGB secret agent and chorus dancer who practices her Soviet brand of martial arts as a means to stardom.
 Fitzwilliam (McKinnon), a gender-non-conforming English teen desperate to obtain a vagina. Sketches also include their father (McGovern).
 Steven, a large man also known as "Waffles" (McGovern). This character originated on McGovern's podcast, Gay Pimpin' with Jonny McGovern.
 Ron Odyssey, a frustrating flamboyant gay male receptionist (Guarino) who gives customers / patients a difficult time.
 Chocolate Puddin', a transgender sex worker. Puddin' originated in McGovern's stage show, "Dirty Stuff".
 Naldo (Andino), a Latino worker, who moves items (e.g. packages, luggage, furniture) in an explicit, sexual manner, unknown to him, exciting his gay male clientele.
Recurring celebrity impersonations include:
 Maya Angelou (Domingo), who reads sexually explicit posts from Craigslist.
 Antonio Banderas (Andino)
 Liza Minnelli (Goldman)
 Elaine Stritch (Paone), who appears performing a series of menial jobs like Wal-Mart greeter, airport luggage inspector, and the like.
 Barbara Walters (McKinnon), appears in "The View" sketches.

Critical reception
 Variety: "[G]ay or straight, the audience has too many options to rely on mediocrity, which is why this exercise would seem a whole lot bigger and gayer if it was just a bit funnier."
 AfterEllen.com (owned by Logo): "BGSS faces inevitable comparisons to mainstream sketch shows like NBC's long-running Saturday Night Live and Fox's Mad TV and In Living Color. The success of SNL has hinged on the ability of its most talented cast members to develop memorable recurring characters. Similarly, the strength of both Mad TV and In Living Color is in the willingness of each to "go there" with the sort of sociopolitical humor that the modern incarnation of SNL (save for its brief and brilliant Tina Fey era) usually avoids... With its cast of mostly queer performers and its residence on a gay network, BGSS has a unique opportunity to do both of those things well. If the first two episodes are any indication, it looks promising."

 The Soup: Host Joel McHale commented unfavorably during the April 24, 2007 episode about BGSG'''s opening sketch, "Pocket Gay Friend", citing its similarity to The Soup's "Little Gay" recurring character that had debuted a year earlier and jokingly threatening a lawsuit.
 AfterElton.com (owned by Logo): "I was pleasantly surprised to find that The Big Gay Sketch Show demonstrates definite promise....this is pretty standard sketch comedy, save a few more gay characters peppered in and some humor based around gay relationships. And to be honest, the skits that had little to do with gayness were often much funnier than the ones that lampooned gay life....if Big Gay'' focuses on developing great characters and skits that don't get bogged down in the concept, the show could become a solid hit."

References

Further reading
   .

External links
 
 

2007 American television series debuts
2010 American television series endings
2000s American LGBT-related comedy television series
2010s American LGBT-related comedy television series
2000s American parody television series
2010s American parody television series
2000s American sketch comedy television series
2010s American sketch comedy television series
Logo TV original programming